Coscinida novemnotata, is a species of spider of the genus Coscinida. It is endemic to Sri Lanka.

See also
 List of Theridiidae species

References

Theridiidae
Endemic fauna of Sri Lanka
Spiders of Asia
Spiders described in 1895